Robert, Bob or Bobby Davidson may refer to:

Arts 
Robert Davidson (artist) (born 1946), Alaska-born Canadian Haida artist
Robert Davidson (composer) (born 1965), Australian composer and double bassist
Robert Davidson (photographer), British rock photographer
Robert Davidson (poet) (1778–1855), Scottish poet and labourer
Robert Lee Davidson, American guitarist
Robert William Davidson (1904–1982), American sculptor

Politics 
Robert Davidson (Australian politician) (1856–1931), New South Wales politician
Robert Davidson (Canadian politician) (1875–1948), Canadian member of Parliament
Robert H. M. Davidson (1832–1908), U.S. Representative from Florida

Sport 
Bob Davidson (footballer) (born 1986), Scottish footballer
Bob Davidson (ice hockey) (1912–1996), Canadian Hockey player
Bob Davidson (umpire) (born 1952), baseball umpire
Bob Davidson (pitcher) (born 1963), baseball pitcher
Bob Davidson (rugby union) (1926–1992), Australian rugby union footballer of the 1940s and 1950s
Bobby Davidson (footballer) (1913–1988), Scottish footballer
Bobby Davidson (1928–1993), Scottish football referee
Robert Davidson (fencer) (born 1958), Australian Olympic fencer
Robert Davidson (footballer, born 1876) (1876–1935), Scottish footballer

Other people 
Robert Davidson (educator) (1750–1812), American educator, clergyman and composer
Robert Davidson (inventor) (1804–1894), Scottish inventor who built the first known electric locomotive in 1837
Robert Davidson (theologian) (1927–2012), Professor Emeritus in the University of Glasgow
Robert Harold Davidson (1919–1982), United States Marine officer
Robert Laurenson Dashiell Davidson (1909–1998), American philatelist

See also
Robert Davison (disambiguation)